Tubosaeta is a genus of fungi in the family Boletaceae. The genus was circumscribed by mycologist Egon Horak in 1967.

References

Boletaceae
Boletales genera